Aaron Moule (born 20 June 1977) is an Australian former professional rugby league footballer who played in the 1990s and 2000s. He played club football for the South Queensland Crushers and Melbourne Storm in Australasia's National Rugby League and Widnes Vikings and Salford City Reds in the Super League.

Early life

Moule grew up in the Redcliffe, Queensland area of Brisbane, playing junior rugby league with Redcliffe Dolphins. He was later captain of the Sunshine Coast schoolboys representative team, leading the team to second place in the state carnival.

Playing career

Moule made his first grade rugby league debut for South Queensland Crushers in the 1997 ARL season, winning the club's rookie of the year honour, before joining Melbourne Storm for the 1998 NRL season.

A consistent, but combative player, Moule was the leading try scorer for Melbourne Storm in 2001 and 2002.

Moule stunned Melbourne by announcing his retirement from the NRL in April 2003, revealing that a succession of injuries had taken away his enjoyment of the game. "At 25, three shoulder reconstructions, knee surgery and a severe case of osteitis pubis head my list of injuries," he said. "Put simply, the passion to play isn't there any more." After sitting out the rest of 2003, in November Moule had agreed to return to rugby league with Widnes Vikings.

Moule retired from the professional game at the end of the 2007 Super League season.

Career highlights and honours
 First Grade Debut: 
1997 – Round 11, South Queensland v Western Suburbs Magpies at Campbelltown Stadium, 18 May
 Rookie of the Year:
1997 – South Queensland Crushers
 Premierships: 
1999 – Melbourne Storm
 World Club Challenge Champions
2000 – Melbourne Storm

References

External links
Salford Squad Profile: Aaron Moule
Salford City Reds Website Homepage
Statistics at rugbyleagueproject.org

1977 births
Living people
Australian rugby league players
South Queensland Crushers players
Melbourne Storm players
Widnes Vikings players
Salford Red Devils players
Rugby league centres
Rugby league players from Brisbane